

X 

 DC Comics characters: X, List of